Dream Island is an island off Antarctica.

Dream Island may also refer to:
 Dream Island (amusement park), a theme park in Moscow
 Yumenoshima (Dream Island), a district of Tokyo
 Dream Island, part of Al Marjan Island, a man-made archipelago in Ras al-Khaimah

See also
 Island of Dreams (disambiguation)